The 1969 Tennessee Volunteers football team (variously "Tennessee", "UT" or the "Vols") represented the University of Tennessee in the 1969 NCAA University Division football season. Playing as a member of the Southeastern Conference (SEC), the team was led by head coach Doug Dickey, in his sixth year, and played their home games at Neyland Stadium in Knoxville, Tennessee. They finished the season with a record of nine wins and two losses (9–2 overall, 5–1 in the SEC) and a loss against Florida in the Gator Bowl.

Tennessee's defense featured Jack Reynolds and All-American Steve Kiner while the offense featured quarterback Bobby Scott throwing to end Ken DeLong. Chip Kell was an All-American guard on the offensive line.

Florida Gators coach Ray Graves' final game saw his club beat the SEC champion Volunteers, 14–13, in the Gator Bowl. The game, which marked the Gator Bowl's silver anniversary had added drama because two days before kickoff word leaked out that Volunteers head coach Doug Dickey, the SEC Coach of the Year, would return to Florida, his alma mater, after the game.

Schedule

Roster
OG #65 Phillip Fulmer, So.
LB #57 Steve Kiner, Sr.
DB Bobby Majors, So.
LB Jack Reynolds, Sr.

Team players drafted into the NFL

References

Tennessee
Tennessee Volunteers football seasons
Southeastern Conference football champion seasons
Tennessee Volunteers football